Nusrat Imrose Tisha, (born February 20, 1989) known mononymously as Tisha, is a Bangladeshi actress, model and producer who has appeared mainly in Bengali television and films. She has garnered landmark popularity with her praised performances both on television and the silver screen.

Born in Rajshahi, Bangladesh, Tisha has raised through the Bangladeshi reality television competition Notun Kuri in 1993. Her first screen appearance, at the age of 9, was in the Bengali television drama Shat Prohorer Kabbo in 1998. As of 2020, she appears more than a hundred television drama. She made her film debut in playing a role named Ru ba Haque in the Bengali drama Third Person Singular Number in 2009. For the role she was nominated for Meril-Prothom Alo Award for Best Film Actress and won Critics Choice Award for Best Film Actress. The film was the Bangladeshi submissions for the 83rd Academy Awards for Best International Feature Film.

She went on to establish herself with starring roles in several films directed by Mostofa Sarwar Farooki, including Television (2012), Doob: No Bed of Roses (2017). As of 2020, her accolades include two National Film Award. Tisha made her debut as a producer in the upcoming American-Indian-Bangladeshi drama No Land's Man, starring Nawazuddin Siddiqui and directed by Mostofa Sarwar Farooki.

Early life
Tisha was born on 20 February 1989 in Rajshahi. Her mother Shaheen Mahfuja Hoque and her father Enamul Hoque. Tisha started learning music at the age of five. In 1993, she took second place in Bangladesh Television's Notun Kuri talent hunt program. In the same contest two years later, she won the gold cup award. She has attended North South University, in Dhaka.

Personal life

Tisha married filmmaker Mostofa Sarwar Farooki on 16 July 2010. Together they have a daughter who has been named as Ilham Nusrat Farooki, born on 5 January 2022.

Career

Television
Tisha started her acting career in 1998 through the television drama Shat Prohorer Kabbo directed by Ahsan Habib and written by Anonto Heera. She also formed a band named Angel Four. In 2005 she was nominated for the Meril-Prothom Alo Award for Best TV Actress for drama Otopor Nurul Nuda directed by Arannya Anwar. And following in 2008 for drama Iit Kather Khancha written and directed by Shihab Khan and in 2009 for Sathe. Tisha won her first Meril-Prothom Alo Award for Best TV Actress for her role in television serial Graduate. In 2011 she was nominated in the same category for the Chander Nijosso Kono Aalo Nei. In the same year, she won her first Meril-Prothom Alo Critics Choice Award for Best TV Actress for the role Tahmina in the television drama Tahminar Dinjapon. In 2012 she won her second Meril-Prothom Alo Award for Best TV Actress awards for Long March and following in 2013 for the drama Jodi Bhalo Na Lage Dio Na Mon. In 2013 she also nominated in the Meril-Prothom Alo Award Critics Choice Award for Best TV Actress category for Duti Britto Pashapashi. In 2014 she won her 5th Meril-Prothom Alo Best TV Actress award for Bijli and in 2015 for drama Tilottama, Tomar Jonno. In 2015 she won her second Meril-Prothom Alo Award Critics Choice Award for Best TV Actress for Shefali. In 2016 Tisha won her 6th Best TV Actress award in Meril-Prothom Alo for the drama Ekti Talgach-er Golpo. Since she is a solo recorded winner for this category.

In 2020, a Durga Puja special drama titled Bijoya written by Salah Uddin Shoaib Choudhury and director Abu Hayat Mahmud Bhuiya, starring Tisha is coming under controversies for hurting religious sentiments. It was stated that allegedly depicting Hindu women as morally questionable and Hindu men as "alcoholic, barbaric and powerless".

Modeling
Tisha first modeled for Meril Lipjel. She has participated in advertisements for Coca-Cola, City cell, Parachute, Bombay Sweets and Keya Cosmetics. She won the Meril Prothom Alo Awards for modeling in 2003 and 2004. After a six-year break, Tisha returned to TV advertising in 2014 by appearing in an ad for Square. She also appeared in ads for Robi, Rupchanda, Dabur Amla etc.

Films

2009-2010: Breakthrough
On the silver screen, Tisha first appeared in Mostofa Sarwar Farooki's critically acclaimed Third Person Singular Number in 2009 starring alongside Mosharraf Karim, Topu, Abul Hayat and others. Jay Weissberg of Variety stated that, "Ruba's revulsion, yet lack of surprise, is beautifully calibrated by Tisha". For her role Ruba Haque, she was nominated for the Best Film Actress and won the Critics Choice Award for Best Film Actress in the 12th Meril-Prothom Alo Awards. The film was the Bangladeshi submissions for the 83rd Academy Awards for Best International Feature Film. Following year, she made a special appearance as Selina in the film Runway directed by Tareque Masud.

2012–2016: Television and other success

Following the success of Third Person Singular Number, in 2012 she starred in Television alongside Chanchal Chowdhury and Mosharraf Karim and directed by Farooki. For her role Kohinur, she was nominated for the Meril-Prothom Alo Award for Best Film Actress. The film also was the Bangladeshi submissions for the 86th Academy Awards for Best International Feature Film.

In 2016, she did her first commercial movie Rana Pagla: The Mental opposite superstar Shakib Khan directed by Shamim Ahmed Roni. Later in the year, she appeared in Ostitto directed by Anonno Mamun starring opposite Arifin Shuvo. For her outstanding performance in this film, she was honoured with the Bangladesh National Film Award for Best Actress in 2016 and nominated for the Meril-Prothom Alo Award for Best Film Actress.

2017-present
In 2017, she was seen in Doob, a Bangladesh-India co-production directed by Mostofa Sarwar Farooki starring alongside Irrfan Khan, Parno Mittra and Rokeya Prachy. She received the prestigious Meril-Prothom Alo Award for Best Film Actress for her performance. The film was the Bangladeshi submissions for the 91st Academy Awards for Best International Feature Film. Later she was seen in Haldaa directed by Tauquir Ahmed starring along with Mosharraf Karim, Zahid Hasan and others. She received her second Bangladesh National Film Award for Best Actress for her role in this film along with Bachsas Award for Best Actress category. In 2018, she starred in the first anthology film of Bangladesh Iti, Tomari Dhaka.

Her first release of 2019 was Fagun Haway based on the historic Language movement of 1952 directed by Tauquir Ahmed starring Siam Ahmed, Abul Hayat, Yashpal Sharma and others. The film was the Bangladeshi submissions for the 92nd Academy Awards for Best International Feature Film. In the same year, she starred as Toru for short The Old Man and The Girl by Afzal Hossain Munna. Tisha is seen in the much anticipated Bangladesh-Germany-Russia co-production Shonibar Bikel directed by Farooki starring along with a multicultural cast including Zahid Hasan, Mamunur Rashid, Parambrata Chatterjee, Eyad Hourani. It is a one-shot thriller inspired by the Holey Artisan Bakery attack in 2016. In this year she also starred in Mayaboti alongside Yash Rohan directed by Arun Chowdhury and featuring in Bonhi a short by Afsana Mimi. She also appeared in Holudboni, a Bangladesh-India co-production alongside Parambrata Chatterjee and Paoli Dam directed by Mukul Roy Chowdhury and Taher Shipon.

Tisha will soon debut as a co-producer in No Land's Man starring Nawazuddin Siddiqui and directed by Mostofa Sarwar Farooki. She also co-producer upcoming film A Burning Question directed by Farooki. As of 2020, she would play the role of Sheikh Fazilatunnesa Mujib in the upcoming film Bangabandhu, based on the life of Sheikh Mujibur Rahman, directed by Shyam Benegal. She also would play the valiant revolutionary Pritilata Waddedar opposite Manoj Kumar in the film Bhalobasha Pritilata directed and co-produced by Pradip Ghosh. She will appear films Dhaka 2040, Bobaa Rohossho by Abhishek Bagchi and Balighar in the upcoming years.

Other work and media image
Tisha was appointed by the South Korean Ministry of Foreign Affairs as a 'goodwill ambassador' for two years for its Dhaka mission as part of the celebration of 40th anniversary of the two countries bilateral relations in 2013.

Filmography

Television

Short films

Web series

Awards and nominations

Bachsas Awards

Meril-Prothom Alo Awards

National Film Award

Notun Kuri 

Rtv Star Award

References

External links

1989 births
Living people
21st-century Bangladeshi actresses
Bengali actresses
Bengali television actresses
Bangladeshi television actresses
Bangladeshi film actresses
Actresses in Bengali cinema
Bangladeshi female models
Bangladeshi film producers
Bangladeshi women film producers
North South University alumni
People from Rajbari District
Best Actress National Film Awards (Bangladesh) winners
Best Actress Bachsas Award winners
Best Film Actress Meril-Prothom Alo Award winners
Best TV Actress Meril-Prothom Alo Critics Choice Award winners
Best TV Actress Meril-Prothom Alo Award winners